The Sir Graham Moore Islands in the Canadian Arctic are an island group located inside western Coronation Gulf, south of Victoria Island, in the Kitikmeot Region, Nunavut, Canada. Other island groups in the vicinity include the Berens Islands, Black Berry Islands Couper Islands, Deadman Islands, Lawford Islands, and Leo Islands.

Vice-Admiral Sir Graham Moore (1764–1843) was a British career officer in the Royal Navy.

References

 Sir Graham Moore Islands at the Atlas of Canada

Islands of Coronation Gulf
Uninhabited islands of Kitikmeot Region